Cornelus Bernardus Rijvers (born 27 May 1926) is a Dutch former footballer who was active as a midfielder and later as coach for PSV Eindhoven and the Netherlands national team. He was born in Breda.

Playing career

Rijvers made his debut at NAC Breda and also played for AS Saint-Étienne, Stade Français and Feijenoord. He was a member of the Netherlands team at the 1948 Summer Olympic Games. 

In 1950 Rijvers became one of the very first Dutch players to turn professional with his transfer to AS Saint-Étienne. The KNVB suspended him from playing in the national team in response because at the time they didn't allow professional players to play in the national team and it wasn't until 1957 he would play in the national team again.

Since the death of Marcelino Campanal in May 2020, Rijvers is the final surviving player who received at least one vote during the inaugural edition (1956) of the Ballon d'Or.

Coaching career
As a manager, he took over FC Twente and coached the team for six years, with good results. After those successful seasons, he moved to PSV Eindhoven. He led the team to win the 1977–78 UEFA Cup. He also won with PSV three Eredivisie titles, in 1975, 1976 and 1978, and the double in 1976. After leaving PSV, he took over the national team and introduced young players like Ronald Koeman, Ruud Gullit and Marco van Basten. The Netherlands failed to qualify for Euro 1984 having better goal difference against Spain until the last day of the qualification, but after Spain's 12–1 win over Malta, the Netherlands ended second in the group. After that Rijvers was sacked by the KNVB and replaced by Rinus Michels.
Erik ten Hag has named Rijvers among the managers who have inspired his coaching career.

Honours

Player
NAC Breda
 Eerste Klasse: 1945–46

Saint-Étienne
 Ligue 1: 1956–57 
 Coupe de France: 1961–62

Manager
PSV
 Eredivisie: 1974–75, 1975–76, 1977–78
 KNVB Beker: 1973–74, 1975–76
 UEFA Cup: 1977–78

Individual
 Rinus Michels Award: 2004

See also
 List of UEFA Cup winning managers

References

External links

 Playing and coaching profile (in Dutch)

1926 births
Living people
UEFA Cup winning managers
Dutch footballers
Netherlands international footballers
Dutch expatriate footballers
Ligue 1 players
Eredivisie players
Feyenoord players
NAC Breda players
AS Saint-Étienne players
Expatriate footballers in France
Stade Français (association football) players
Olympic footballers of the Netherlands
Footballers at the 1948 Summer Olympics
Association football midfielders
Expatriate football managers in Belgium
Dutch expatriate football managers
Dutch football managers
Footballers from Breda
FC Twente managers
K. Beringen F.C. managers
Rinus Michels Award winners